Strabena perrieri is a butterfly in the family Nymphalidae. It is found on Madagascar, where it is known from the Sambirano River area. The habitat consists of forests.

References

Strabena
Butterflies described in 1951
Endemic fauna of Madagascar
Butterflies of Africa